Dylan Alcott defeated David Wagner in the final, 6–2, 4–6, 6–2 to win the inaugural quad singles wheelchair tennis title at the 2019 French Open.

Seeds

Draw

Finals

References
 Draw

Wheelchair Quad Singles
French Open, 2019 Quad Singles